Aldo Roberto Rodríguez Baquero (born March, 17 1983 in Havana) is a Cuban rapper and member of the group Los Aldeanos. They are one of the most influential underground rap groups in Cuba. Rodriguez' lyrics deal with social injustices, poverty, racism, police brutality, and prostitution in Cuba.

References

1984 births
Living people
Cuban rappers
21st-century Cuban male singers